Wentworth Springs is a set of springs that was once the site of a settlement and a camping resort in El Dorado County, California.

References

Reference bibliography 

Former settlements in El Dorado County, California
Former populated places in California